Ezra Palmer Gould (February 27, 1841 – August 22, 1900) was a Baptist and later, Episcopal, minister, He graduated Harvard University in 1861 and subsequently served in the Civil War. He entered the ministry in 1868. His commentary on the Gospel of Mark continued to be reprinted in the International Critical Commentary series.

Early life, family, and education

Ezra Palmer Gould was born in Boston, Massachusetts, on February 27, 1841, to S.L. Gould and Frances Ann Shelton Gould.
He attended Harvard University, graduating in 1861, and was a member of Phi Beta Kappa. He was married September 1, 1868, to Jenny M. Stone, and had two children, Herbert Shelton and Edith Parker.

Military service

Shortly after his graduation, he enlisted as a private in the 24th Regiment Massachusetts Volunteer Infantry, and was soon promoted to the rank of corporal. His regiment participated in the Battle of New Bern, and was stationed near that community for nine months. During this time, he received news of his brother's death at Antietam. He was then commissioned as second lieutenant of the 55th Massachusetts Volunteers on Oct. 15, 1863, and subsequently commissioned as a captain with the 59th Massachusetts Volunteers. While commanding the 55th Massachusetts during the Battle of the Wilderness, he was wounded in the left arm and hand, and ultimately lost the little finger on that hand.

Seminary Education and Work
Upon leaving his military service in 1865, he entered Newton Theological Institution, a Baptist seminary, graduating three years later, and immediately becoming professor of New Testament Literature and Interpretation, a position which he held until 1882. In 1889, he assumed a similar position at the Protestant Episcopal Divinity School in Philadelphia, which he held for nine years, and was ordained into the Episcopal priesthood on Feb. 18, 1891.

Pastorates
 Old Cambridge Baptist Church - 1868-?
 Berean Baptist Church (Burlington, Virginia) - 1884-1888
 St. George's Episcopal Church, New York - 1898-1900

Publications

Books

Journal articles

References

External links
 "Capt Ezra Palmer Gould" (memorial and gravesite information). Salt Lake City, Utah: Find A Grave, retrieved online August 15, 2018.
 

1900 deaths
People of Massachusetts in the American Civil War
Harvard University alumni
American biblical scholars
Bible commentators
Episcopal Divinity School faculty
1841 births
New Testament scholars
Andover Newton Theological School alumni
Andover Newton Theological School faculty